Leksvik is a village in Indre Fosen municipality in Trøndelag county, Norway.  The village is located on the western shore of the Trondheimsfjorden.  The village lies at the junction of Norwegian County Road 755 and Norwegian County Road 89.  Leksvik Church is located in the village.  The village was the administrative centre of the old municipality of Leksvik from 1838 until its dissolution in 2017 when it became part of Indre Fosen municipality.

References

Villages in Trøndelag
Indre Fosen